The Ministry of Endowments or Ministry of Awqaf is a department of the Government of Syria.

Responsibilities 
The ministry is responsible for Islamic religious affairs and the administration of endowments.

Ministers of Awqaf 
 Abd al-Rahman al-Kayyali (14 October 1944 – 1 April 1945)
 Said al-Ghazzi (7 April 1945 – 16 August 1945)
Youssef Muzahim (17 March 1960 – 28 September 1961)
Ahmed Sultan (29 September 1961 – 21 November 1961)
Mustafa Al-Zarqa (22 November 1961 – 15 April 1962)
Rashid Humaidan (16.04.1962 – 16 September 1962)
Asaad Al-Kourani (17 September 1962 – 9 March 1963)
Darwish Al-Alwani (09.03.1963 – 31 March 1963)
Mazhar Al-Anbari (1 April 1963 – 30 April 1963)
Ahmed Mahdi Al-Khidr (1 May 1963 – 12April 1963)
Abdul Rahman Al-Tabbaa (13May 1963 – 10 February 1964)
Abdul Rahman Al Kawakibi (13 May 1964 – 31 December 1965)

 Mohammed Ghaleb Abdoun (16 January 1966 – 4 April 1971)
 Abdul Sattar Khair al-Din al-Asadi (4 April 1971 – 13 January 1980)
 Mohammed al-Khatib (14 January 1980 – 30 October 1987)
 Abdel Majid Trabelsi (1 November 1987 – 7 February 1996)
 Mohammed Abdul Raouf Ziada (7 April 1996 - 3 October 2004)
 Ziyad al-Din al-Ayyubi (3 October 2004 – 7 December 2007)
 Mohammed Abdul Sattar (8 December 2007 – incumbent)

References

See also 

 Government ministries of Syria
 Cabinet of Syria

Government ministries of Syria
Ministries established in 1944
Religious affairs ministries
Organizations based in Damascus